The 2020 Bangkok Challenger was a professional tennis tournament played on hard courts. It was the twelfth edition of the tournament and was part of the 2020 ATP Challenger Tour. It took place in Bangkok, Thailand between 12 and 18 January 2020.

Singles main-draw entrants

Seeds

 1 Rankings are as of 6 January 2020.

Other entrants
The following players received wildcards into the singles main draw:
  Congsup Congcar
  Palaphoom Kovapitukted
  Michael Mathayomchand
  Kasidit Samrej
  Wishaya Trongcharoenchaikul

The following player received entry into the singles main draw as an alternate:
  Sadio Doumbia

The following players received entry from the qualifying draw:
  Vladyslav Orlov
  Sidharth Rawat

The following player received entry into the singles main draw as a lucky loser:
  Tomislav Brkić

Champions

Singles

 Attila Balázs def.  Aslan Karatsev 7–6(7–5), 0–6, 7–6(8–6).

Doubles

 Andrey Golubev /  Aleksandr Nedovyesov def.  Sanchai Ratiwatana /  Christopher Rungkat 3–6, 7–6(7–1), [10–5].

References

 
2020 ATP Challenger Tour
Tennis, ATP Challenger Tour, Bangkok Challenger
Tennis, ATP Challenger Tour, Bangkok Challenger
2020
Tennis, ATP Challenger Tour, Bangkok Challenger